Mick Burke (born 1941 in Mitchelstown, County Cork) is an Irish former sportsperson. He played Gaelic football with his local club Mitchelstown and was a member of the Cork senior inter-county team from 1961 until 1969.

References

1941 births
Living people
Mitchelstown Gaelic footballers
Cork inter-county Gaelic footballers
Munster inter-provincial Gaelic footballers